Austrolimnius nomia is a beetle in the Elmidae family. The scientific name of this species was first published in 1965 by Hinton.

References

Byrrhoidea
Elmidae
Beetles described in 1965